Huachuan County is a county of eastern Heilongjiang province in the People's Republic of China. It is under the jurisdiction of the prefecture-level city of Jiamusi.

Administrative divisions 
Huachuan County is divided into 5 towns and 4 townships. 
5 towns
 Hengtoushan, Sujiadian, Yuelai, Xincheng, Simajia
4 townships
 Donghe, Lifeng, Chuangye, Xinghuo

Demographics 

Climate

Notes and references

External links
  Government site - 

Huachan